Farnham is a village and civil parish in the Harrogate district of North Yorkshire, England. It is situated immediately north of Knaresborough.

Farnham Gravel Pit hosted Britain's first Pacific diver in January/February 2007.

The Knaresborough hoard of Roman vessels found in 1864 was probably discovered near Farnham.

Farnham is the location of a large factory, Treves UK which makes automotive components.

See also
 Farnham Mires

References

External links

Villages in North Yorkshire
Civil parishes in North Yorkshire